Basford Hall Yard is a railway marshalling yard near the town of Crewe, Cheshire, England. Initially used to marshal trains, the site now acts as a hub mainly for Freightliner intermodal trains, but also houses departmental sidings (track engineering works) as used by Freightliner Heavy Haul, and other operators. For a period in the 1930s, Basford Hall was the busiest marshalling yard in Europe, handing between 28,000 and 47,000 wagons every week.

The yard is a nationally important node on the West Coast Main Line (WCML), with most freight trains routed through the yard in order to avoid congesting the nearby Crewe railway station, which is also an important junction on the WCML for passengers. The yard is now one of the busiest in Great Britain for freight traffic.

History
The railway through Crewe was opened by the Grand Junction Railway (GJR) in 1837, however, the marshalling yard at Basford Hall was not built until 1901, when the LNWR, successors to the GJR, built avoiding lines due to the amount of freight trains passing through Crewe railway station. The opening of Basford Hall, allowed smaller yards at Gresty Green, Gresty Lane and North Staffordshire Junction to be closed and the traffic handled there transferred to the new yard. Between the 1920s and 1940s, the average number of wagons shunted at the yard, amounted to 28,000 per week.

The yard was adapted as part of the 1955 Modernisation Plan, and electrified in 1961 when the West Coast Main Line was electrified through Crewe to Liverpool and Manchester between 1960 and 1966. The re-modelling of the yard, which was undertaken between June 1959 and November 1961, amounted to £280,000, and included the installation of a hump and  electrified sidings. Previously, the yard was flat-shunted, but the addition of the hump allowed wagonload traffic to be sorted efficiently in the sidings. The electrification of the yard was complete by June 1962, and a new link to the Crewe–Derby line and to the south connecting to the Madeley line, allowed for a greater throughput of traffic and the closure of the yards at Chatterley and Alsager.

After Speedlink was closed down, some wagonload traffic continued, and Crewe was used as a marshalling point for terminals in the north west from 1991. A dedicated service ran from Crewe to Dover to connect with the train ferry, and also from Crewe to Mossend Yard. This was the first time that Basford Hall had been used for marshalling since 1972.

The yard is connected to the West Coast Main Line to the south (Basford Hall Junction), but has access from the north end to the Shrewsbury Line, and via the Independent Lines to the Chester line, the Manchester and Middlewich lines and the West Coast Main Line to the north. The yard remains an important staging point on the West Coast Main Line, with much of the freight services passing through in order to avoid using the congested approaches to  railway station.

Freightliner
Since the 1970s, the main use of Basford Hall has been the stabling and swapping of intermodal trains operated by the Freightliner Group. The use of Basford Hall as a node in the Freightliner network has been in use since the 1970s. Before the privatisation of British Rail, Freightliner trains would run from various locations in the north west, and also to and from Leeds and Holyhead, which were then swapped to make whole trains for other locations. In 1992, the destination roster was changed so that all services stopped at Crewe to allow swapping of containers. This meant that any destination or point of origin was possible with only one change. Whilst this process has lessened in the 21st century, Basford Hall is still an important location for the stabling and rearranging of trains for Freightliner's intermodal network. Basford Hall has a large throughput of traffic, partly due to its location on the avoiding lines from Crewe station, and as such, is now one of the busiest rail freight yards in Great Britain.

Freightliner also stable non-intermodal freight trains at Basford Hall, and they have a maintenance location on site for wagons and locomotives, but heavier repairs and maintenance is still undertaken at Leeds Midland Road. A fuelling point was opened at Basford Hall in 1998, when the yard experienced an upsurge in traffic, and in 2000, further remodelling of the down yard (on the west side of the complex) was undertaken. The Basford Hall facility is the home depot of the Class 86 and Class 90 fleet, and has five roads under cover. The traction maintenance depot (TMD) was opened on site in 2016, with the TOPS code of BA.

Local distribution centre
Freightliner also operate the local distribution centre (LDC) at Crewe. LDCs were introduced in the late 1990s as part of a new plan on the privatised railway. Previously, engineering trains of ballast, track and sleepers were taken direct from their locations to wherever the work was needed, but the privatised railway introduced a streamlining of the "departmental" system of trains and established virtual quarries (VQ) in strategic locations. Crewe Basford Hall LDC was opened in July 2000, replacing a VQ at Guide Bridge, (on the east side of Manchester), initially receiving ballast for its stockpile from Penmaenmawr Quarry on the North Wales coast, it has since had ballast delivered from Mountsorrel and Stud Farm in Leicestershire. Railtrack, Network Rail's predecessor, invested £3 million in remodelling part of Basford Hall for the new contract, which would include new sidings for the High Output Ballast Cleaner (HOBC).

The LDC has disposed of rails and metal sleepers via the EAF smelter at Aldwarke, and used ballast as recycled aggregates to a disposal point in Longport.

HS2
As part of the HS2 plan to link into Crewe railway station, a new infrastructure maintenance depot would be built to the west of the current Basford Hall yard. This would cover  and be linked southwards onto the HS2 line.

Notes

References

Sources

External links

Aerial view of yard from 1948
Simplified diagram of current yard (page 9)
Mapping from 1897 and 1908, showing an engine shed where Basford Hall is now located

Buildings and structures in Crewe
Rail yards in the United Kingdom
Rail transport in Cheshire